Leporinus vanzoi is a species of anostomid fish. It is endemic to Brazil and found in the Tapajós (upper Amazon basin). It can grow to  standard length.

Etymology
The fish is named in honor of herpetologist Paulo Emílio “Vanzo” Vanzolini (1924–2013), the founder of Expedição Permanente à Amazônia (EPA), which has greatly contributed to the Amazonian fish collection at the Universidade de São Paulo, Museu de Zoologia in São Paulo, Brazil and to Brazilian fish studies in general. The type specimens were collected by members of the EPA under the direction of Vanzolini.

References

Anostomidae
Freshwater fish of Brazil
Endemic fauna of Brazil
Taxa named by Heraldo Antonio Britski
Taxa named by Júlio César Garavello
Fish described in 2005